Church of the Holy Heart of Jesus can refer to:
 Church of the Holy Heart of Jesus (Opatówek), Poland
 Church of the Holy Heart of Jesus (Podgorica), Montenegro